This is a list of people who have served as Lord-lieutenant of Perth and Kinross. The office replaced the Lord Lieutenant of Perthshire and the Lord Lieutenant of Kinross-shire in 1975.

Butter had been Lord Lieutenant of Perthshire
Sir David Butter 1975–1995
Sir David Montgomery, 9th Baronet 11 April 1995 – 2006
Brig Sir Melville Stewart Jameson 14 August 2006 – 2019
Gordon Kenneth Stephen Leckie BA CDir 23 July 2019 – present

References

External links
Perth & Kinross Lieutenancy

Perth and Kinross
Perth and Kinross